Furioso may refer to:

Horses
 Furioso, a Hungarian Thoroughbred stallion foaled in 1836, foundation stallion of the 
 Furioso or Furioso-North Star horse breed of Hungary
 Furioso (horse), a British Thoroughbred stallion foaled in 1939
 Furioso II, son of the above, a Selle Français stallion foaled in 1965

Arts and entertainment
 Furioso, a musical tempo indication
 Furioso (film), a 1950 West German film directed by Johannes Meyer
 Furioso (album), by Pavor, 2003
 Furioso (Dimension Six), a 1980 role-playing game 
 Furioso, a literary magazine by James Jesus Angleton and Reed Whittemore
 Il furioso all'isola di San Domingo, or Il furioso, an opera by Donizetti

People
Tintoretto (1518–1594), an Italian painter nicknamed Il Furioso

See also

 Furio (disambiguation)
 Furiosa (disambiguation)
 Furious (disambiguation)
 Fury (disambiguation)
 Orlando Furioso, an Italian epic poem and opera
 Bombastes Furioso, an opera